Indiana, Pennsylvania could refer to:
 The borough of Indiana, Pennsylvania
 Indiana County, Pennsylvania
 Indiana Township, Allegheny County, Pennsylvania